Pyrrhobryum parramattense is a moss found in very moist situations in Australia, Norfolk Island and New Zealand. Parramatta Moss is a large and luxuriant species, often seen in rainforests. Described from a sample collected near Parramatta.

References 

Rhizogoniales